is Japanese female novelist who currently lives in Tokyo, Japan.

Works
  (published in 1999/05)
  (published in 1999/12)
  (published in 2000/07)
  (published in 1999/09)
  (Co-writer. Illustrated by Naoko Takeuchi)
 Mermaid Panic (Co-writer. Illustrated by Naoko Takeuchi)
  (Co-writer. Illustrated by Naoko Takeuchi)
  (Co-writer. Illustrated by Naoko Takeuchi)

References

Living people
Japanese writers
Year of birth missing (living people)